is a railway station in the town of Mogami, Yamagata, Japan, operated by East Japan Railway Company (JR East).

Lines
Mogami Station is served by the Rikuu East Line, and is located 65.6 rail kilometers from the terminus of the line at Kogota Station.

Station layout
The station has one island platform, connected to the station building by a level crossing. The station is staffed, and the station building incorporates the Mogami Public Hall.

Platforms

History
The station was absorbed into the JR East network upon the privatization of JNR on April 1, 1987. It was renamed to its present name on December 4, 1999.

Passenger statistics
In fiscal 2018, the station was used by an average of 143 passengers daily (boarding passengers only).

Surrounding area
 
Mogami Town Hall
Mogami Post Office

See also
List of railway stations in Japan

References

External links

 JR East Station information 

Railway stations in Yamagata Prefecture
Rikuu East Line
Railway stations in Japan opened in 1916
Mogami, Yamagata